Hidden Valley may refer to:

Places

Antarctica
 Hidden Valley (Antarctica), in Victoria Land

Australia
 Hidden Valley, one of Alice Springs town camps, Northern Territory
Hidden Valley, Northern Territory, a suburb in Darwin
Hidden Valley Raceway, a motorsports complex located near Darwin
Hidden Valley, Queensland, a locality in the Shire of Livingstone
Mirima National Park, Western Australia, previously known as Hidden Valley National Park
An area of Wallan, Victoria

Canada
Hidden Valley, Calgary, a neighbourhood in Calgary, Alberta
Hidden Valley Highlands, a ski area in Huntsville, Ontario
Hidden Valley Resort, a holiday resort in Huntsville, Ontario

Indonesia
 Baliem Valley in Papua, also known as Ichiban

Papua New Guinea
 Hidden Valley mine, a gold mine operated by Newcrest Mining

Nepal
 Hidden Valley, in the Dhaulagiri massif

Scotland
Coire Gabhail, also known as Hidden Valley, in the Bidean nam Bian mountain massif

United States
Hidden Valley, California (disambiguation), multiple locations
Hidden Valley (Ski Estes Park), Colorado
Hidden Valley, Indiana
Hidden Valley, Nevada, on Interstate 15
Hidden Valley (New Jersey), a skiing facility in Vernon Township
Hidden Valley (Charlotte, North Carolina)
Hidden Valley, Pennsylvania
Hidden Valley (Virginia)
Hidden Valley (Bacova, Virginia), listed in the National Register of Historic Places
Hidden Valley, West Virginia
Hidden Valley Farm, Baldwin, Maryland, listed in the National Register of Historic Places
Hidden Valley High School (disambiguation)
Hidden Valley Lake (disambiguation)
Hidden Valley Resort (Pennsylvania), a ski resort in Pennsylvania
Hidden Valley Rockshelter, Warm Springs, Virginia, listed in the National Register of Historic Places
Hidden Valley Ski Area, a skiing area in Missouri

Mars
A dune-filled valley near the slopes of Aeolis Mons

Other uses
 Hidden Valley Ranch, a brand of salad dressing
 Hidden Valley (film), a 1932 singing cowboy western
 The Hidden Valley, a 1916 silent film starring Valda Valkyrien
 The Hidden Valley of Oz, a 1951 book by Rachel R. Cosgrove

See also
 Hidden Valley Lake (disambiguation)
 Orakei Korako (also known as The Hidden Valley), a geothermal area in the Taupo Volcanic Zone, New Zealand